Pehr Evind Svinhufvud's second cabinet was the 18th government of Republic of Finland. Cabinet's time period was from July 4, 1930 to March 21, 1931. It was majority government. 
 

 

Svinhufvud, 2
1930 establishments in Finland
1931 disestablishments in Finland
Cabinets established in 1930
Cabinets disestablished in 1931